Juan de Zubileta was one of the members of Ferdinand Magellan's expedition to circumnavigate the globe, which began in Seville on August 10, 1519. Zubileta, from Barakaldo, was one of the eighteen men who managed to complete the expedition, reaching Sanlúcar de Barrameda on September 6, 1522, on the Victoria, along with 17 other survivors.

External links
 Juan de Zubileta (Leyenda)

16th-century Spanish people
Circumnavigators of the globe